Isla brava is a 1958 Argentine film directed by Mario Soffici and starring Elsa Daniel.

Cast

Mirko Álvarez
Alberto Argibay
Juan Buryúa Rey
Miguel Caiazzo
Fernando Campos
Elsa Daniel
José De Angelis
Floren Delbene
Carlos Escobares
Alfonso Estela
Carmen Giménez	.
Tito Grassi
Eduardo de Labar
Claudio Lucero
Mariángeles
Paquita Más
Inés Moreno
Frank Nelson
José Olivero
Oscar Orlegui
Martín Resta
Félix Rivero
María Luisa Robledo
Luis Rodrigo
Martha Roldán
Enrique San Miguel
Alfredo Santacruz
Mario Soffici

External links
 

1958 films
1950s Spanish-language films
Argentine black-and-white films
Films directed by Mario Soffici
1950s Argentine films